Benito Huerta (born 1952) is an American artist and Professor at the University of Texas Arlington. Huerta was born in Corpus Christi, Texas.

His work is included in the collections of the Museum of Fine Arts Houston, the Amon Carter Museum, the Blanton Museum of Art, and the Menil Collection.

References

Living people
1952 births
Artists from Texas
20th-century American artists
21st-century American artists